The Gruber Prize in Cosmology, established in 2000, is one of three prestigious international awards worth US$500,000 made by the Gruber Foundation, a non-profit organization based at Yale University in New Haven, Connecticut.

Since 2001, the Gruber Prize in Cosmology has been co-sponsored by the International Astronomical Union.

Recipients are selected by a panel from nominations that are received from around the world.

The Gruber Foundation Cosmology Prize honors a leading cosmologist, astronomer, astrophysicist or scientific philosopher for theoretical, analytical or conceptual discoveries leading to a fundamental advances in the field.

Recipients
2022 Frank Eisenhauer
2021 Marc Kamionkowski, Uroš Seljak, and Matias Zaldarriaga
2020 Lars Hernquist and Volker Springel
2019 Nicholas Kaiser and Joseph Silk, "for their seminal contributions to the theory of cosmological structure formation and probes of dark matter".
2018 Nazzareno Mandolesi, Jean-Loup Puget and ESA Planck team.
2017 Sandra M. Faber
2016 Ronald Drever, Kip Thorne, Rainer Weiss, and the entire Laser Interferometer Gravitational-Wave Observatory (LIGO) discovery team.
2015 John E. Carlstrom, Jeremiah P. Ostriker and Lyman A. Page, Jr
2014 Sidney van den Bergh, Jaan Einasto, Kenneth Freeman and R. Brent Tully
2013 Viatcheslav Mukhanov and Alexei Starobinsky
2012 Charles L. Bennett (Professor of Physics and Astronomy at Johns Hopkins University) and the Wilkinson Microwave Anisotropy Probe (WMAP) Team
2011 Simon White, Carlos Frenk, Marc Davis and George Efstathiou
2010 Charles Steidel, the Lee A. DuBridge Professor of Astronomy at the California Institute of Technology, in recognition of his revolutionary studies of the most distant galaxies in the universe
2009  Wendy Freedman, director of the Observatories of the Carnegie Institution of Washington in Pasadena, California; Robert Kennicutt, director of the Institute of Astronomy at the University of Cambridge in England; and Jeremy Mould, professorial fellow at the University of Melbourne School of Physics
2008 J. Richard Bond, director of the Canadian Institute for Advanced Research Cosmology and Gravity Program; Canadian Institute for Theoretical Astrophysics 
2007  High-z Supernova Search Team, Supernova Cosmology Project, Brian P. Schmidt and Saul Perlmutter 
2006 John Mather (co-recipient of the 2006 Nobel Prize in Physics) and the Cosmic Background Explorer (COBE) Team 
2005 James E. Gunn principal designer of the Hubble Space Telescope
2004 Alan Guth and Andrei Linde 
2003 Rashid Sunyaev director of the Max-Planck-Institut für Astrophysik
2002 Vera Rubin
2001 Lord Martin Rees
2000 Allan Sandage and Philip James E. Peebles

See also

 List of astronomy awards

References

External links
 Gruber Foundation Web site

Astronomy prizes
Physical cosmology
Awards established in 2000
American awards

ru:Премия Грубера по космологии